Galatasaray SK. women's 1987–1988 season is the 1987–1988 basketball season for Turkish professional basketball club Galatasaray Medical Park.

The club competes in the Turkish Women's Basketball League.

Depth chart

Results, schedules and standings

Turkish Basketball League 1987–88

Regular season

First half

Second half

References

1988
Galatasaray Sports Club 1987–88 season